Bergljot Hobæk Haff (1 May 1925 – 12 February 2016) was a Norwegian educator and novelist.

Biography
Haff was born at  Botne (now Holmestrand) in Vestfold, Norway. Her parents were Lars Hobæk (1883–1938) and   Martha Aarvold (1895–1987). Both of her parents were  educators. She graduated from the Sandefjord Gymnasium in 1943. In 1947, she graduated from Oslo lærerhøgskole (now Oslo University College) with a degree in education. Upon completing her education, she moved to  Denmark  and taught school for 24 years before returning to Oslo in 1972. 

She made her debut with the novel Raset in 1956. She has written both contemporary  and historical novels. Her writing has been characterized by original narrative and often by poetical imagination. Her works have also featured both  mythical and allegorical interpretation. Her novels have been  translated into several languages including English, French, Dutch, Spanish, Italian, Swedish and Lithuanian.

Personal life
She was married twice. In 1948, she married  Jørgen Haff (1925–1977). Their marriage was dissolved in 1961. In 1964, she married  Søren Christensen. Their  marriage was dissolved in 1972.  Her daughter Marianne Hobæk Haff is a professor of French linguistics at the University of Oslo.

Awards
Haff was awarded the Norwegian Critics Prize for Literature in 1962 for Bålet. She received the Dobloug Prize (Doblougprisen) in 1985,  the Norwegian Academy Prize in 1988 and the Aschehoug Prize (Aschehougprisen) in 1989. She also was awarded the Brage Prize (Brageprisen) in 1996 for Skammen, the Norwegian Critics Prize for Literature 1996, for Skammen  and the Riksmål Society Literature Prize in 1996. She was nominated twice for the Nordic Council's Literature Prize, once for Den guddommelige tragedie and again for Renhetens pris.

Bibliography 
Raset – novel – published in English as “The Landslide” (1956)
Liv – novel (1958)
Du finner ham aldri – novel (1960)
Bålet – novel – published in English as “The Bonfire”  (1962)
Skjøgens bok – novel (1965)
Den sorte kappe – novel (1969)
Sønnen – novel (1971)
Heksen – novel (1974)
Gudsmoren. En menneskelig komedie – novel (1977)
Jeg, Bakunin – novel (1983)
Den guddommelige tragedie – novel (1989)
Renhetens pris – novel (1992)
Skammen – novel – published in English as “Shame” (1996)
Sigbrits bålferd – novel (1999)
Den evige jøde – novel (2002)
Attentatet – novel (2004)

References

1925 births
2016 deaths
People from Holmestrand
Oslo University College alumni
Norwegian educators
Norwegian women novelists
20th-century Norwegian novelists
21st-century Norwegian novelists
20th-century Norwegian women writers
21st-century Norwegian women writers
Dobloug Prize winners